The Serie B 1953–54 was the twenty-second tournament of this competition played in Italy since its creation.

Teams
Pavia and Alessandria had been promoted from Serie C, while Como and Pro Patria had been relegated from Serie A.

Final classification

Results

Promotion tie-breaker

Pro Patria promoted to Serie A.

References and sources
Almanacco Illustrato del Calcio - La Storia 1898-2004, Panini Edizioni, Modena, September 2005

Serie B seasons
2
Italy